Burdale Tunnel is a former railway tunnel on the abandoned Malton and Driffield Junction Railway (MDR) in North Yorkshire, England. Construction of the tunnel began in 1847, but suffered financial difficulties and building was not complete until 1853. The line was closed completely a hundred years later in 1957, but the tunnel was still being used by members of the public, so the portals were bricked up in 1961. During 1970s and 1980s, there were collapses inside the tunnel and in 2009 the restoration of the passenger line could not continue due to the damage.

History and description

Burdale Tunnel lies near the village of Burdale, North Yorkshire, England, between the former Burdale and Wharram railway stations. It was built to take the railway through the Yorkshire Wolds. The lack of funds led to alternate lengths being proposed, including a  route which would have meant a steep incline. During construction illegal drinking houses were built and riots occurred in navvies' temporary accommodation near the tunnel's northern mouth.

The line closed to passenger traffic in 1950 and closed completely in 1958, with the tracks being lifted shortly afterwards. However, the closure did not deter visitors and therefore the tunnel portals were bricked up in 1961. In the late 1970s, a collapse occurred just north of the tunnel's second ventilation shaft – around half-a-mile in. During the 1980s the tunnel collapsed further, blocking a middle section completely.

Restoration plans
In 2009, the Yorkshire Wolds Railway Restoration Project proposed that the railway could be reopened though the condition of the Burdale Tunnel collapse was still unknown.

See also
Yorkshire Wolds Railway

References

Sources

External links

Railway tunnels in England
Rail transport in North Yorkshire
Tunnels in North Yorkshire
Tunnels completed in 1853
Malton and Driffield Junction Railway